Olle Länsberg (28 March 1922 – 28 September 1998) was a Swedish writer. He wrote for ten films between 1947 and 1973.

Selected filmography
 Port of Call (1948)
 Skipper in Stormy Weather (1951)
 Violence (1955)
 The Hard Game (1956)
 A Goat in the Garden (1958)
 Dear John (1964)

References

External links

1922 births
1998 deaths
Swedish male screenwriters
People from Gothenburg
20th-century Swedish screenwriters
20th-century Swedish male writers